The Red Mosque is a ruined mosque in Berat Castle, Berat, Albania. It is a Cultural Monument of Albania since 1961.

History 
According to Ottoman explorer Evliya Çelebi (1611-1682), the mosque was built under the reign of Bayazid II. It was probably built in the 15th century and was one of the oldest mosques in the country. It was probably built shortly after the conquest of Berat by the Ottomans in 1417. The oldest written record dates from 1431/32. The original names were Mosque of the ruler and Mosque of conquest.

The mosque was used by caravans crossing the continent, and later by the Ottoman army.

Description 

The mosque is located just outside the citadel within the Berat Castle. The basic dimensions were 9.9 to 9.1 meters and had a wooden roof. It was built with red bricks and limestone.

The minaret is unusually on the left of entrance. The cylindrical part on its top is unique in the Islam culture. Inside, a small circular staircase gives access to the top for a 360 view of the castle and the city.

References

Cultural Monuments of Albania
Mosques in Berat
Ottoman architecture in Albania
Ruins in Albania